Loreto, officially the Municipality of Loreto (Surigaonon: Lungsod nan Loreto;), is a 4th class municipality in the province of Dinagat Islands, Philippines. According to the 2020 census, it has a population of 9,690 people.

History
The town became a part of the province of Dinagat Islands on October 2, 2006, when the province was created from Surigao del Norte by Republic Act No. 9355. However, in February 2010, the Supreme Court ruled that the law was unconstitutional, as the necessary requirements for provincial land area and population were not met. The town reverted to Surigao del Norte. On October 24, 2012, however, the Supreme Court reversed its ruling from the previous year, and upheld the constitutionality of RA 9355 and the creation of Dinagat Islands as a province.

In 1956, the sitio of Roxas was converted into a barrio.

Geography

Barangays 
Loreto is politically subdivided into 10 barangays.
 Carmen (Poblacion)
 Esperanza
 Ferdinand
 Helen (on Gibusong Island)
 Liberty (on Gibusong Island)
 Magsaysay (on Gibusong Island)
 Panamaon
 San Juan (Poblacion)
 Santa Cruz (Poblacion)
 Santiago (Poblacion)

Climate

Demographics

Economy

The town is endowed with rich mineral resources like aluminous laterite ore, chromite, gold, niceliferous laterite, sand and gravel, guano, rock phosphate, limestone, and siliceous sand. It is also considered as an excellent fishing ground.

References

External links
   Loreto Profile at the DTI Cities and Municipalities Competitive Index
 [ Philippine Standard Geographic Code]

Municipalities of Dinagat Islands
Mining communities in the Philippines